The term nastygram may refer to:
 A cease and desist letter, often one received from a copyright holder
 A Christmas tree packet (networking)
 A demand letter used to collect a debt or penalties due to a breach of contract